Indian River is a First Nations reserve on Lake Rosseau surrounded by Muskoka Lakes and close to the unincorporated community of Port Carling, Ontario. It is shared between the Chippewas of Rama First Nation and the Wahta Mohawks.

References

External links
 Canada Lands Survey System

Ojibwe reserves in Ontario
Mohawk reserves in Ontario
Communities in the District Municipality of Muskoka